Roger John Field  (born 5 July 1946) is a retired New Zealand plant scientist and university administrator. He served as the vice-chancellor of Lincoln University from 2004 to 2012.

Career
Born in Birmingham, England, on 5 July 1946, Field completed a joint honours degree in botany and zoology at the University of Hull, and a PhD in plant science, also at Hull. The title of his doctoral thesis was The movement of plant growth regulators and herbicides.

Field was appointed as a lecturer in plant science at Lincoln College (now Lincoln University) in 1970, and became a naturalised New Zealand citizen in 1977. He rose to become professor of plant science in 1986. In April 2004, he was appointed vice-chancellor, retiring in 2012. He was Lincoln University’s third vice-chancellor and the 10th head of the institution since it was founded in 1878. He also served as the chair of the New Zealand Vice-Chancellors’ Committee, and was a council member of the Association of Commonwealth Universities.

Honours
In the 2013 New Year Honours, Field was appointed an Officer of the New Zealand Order of Merit, for services to education and land-based industries.

References

1946 births
Living people
Academic staff of the Lincoln University (New Zealand)
Officers of the New Zealand Order of Merit
Scientists from Birmingham, West Midlands
Alumni of the University of Hull
English emigrants to New Zealand
Naturalised citizens of New Zealand
Plant physiologists
20th-century New Zealand botanists